is the 24th single by Japanese singer Yōko Oginome. Written by Reo Mikami and Satoshi Hirose, the single was released on March 27, 1992, by Victor Entertainment.

Background and release
The song was used by Ginza Jewelry for their Camelia Diamond commercial.

The B-side is "Moonlight Blue", which is completely different from the similarly titled song from Oginome's 1991 album Trust Me.

"Steal Your Love" peaked at No. 15 on Oricon's singles chart and sold over 129,000 copies.

Oginome re-recorded the song in her 2014 cover album Dear Pop Singer.

Track listing
All music is arranged by Yukio Sugai, Kōichi Kaminaga, and Ryujin Inoue.

Charts

References

External links

1992 singles
Yōko Oginome songs
Japanese-language songs
Victor Entertainment singles